Barizo is a fishing town in the northern part of Spain, specifically along the Costa da Morte in the province of A Coruña in the autonomous region of Galicia.

Economy 
Barizo's economy depends mostly on fishing. Conveniently located along the Costa da Morte, Barizo is also dubbed as a resort town. Accommodations in this town are mostly consisted of small hotels offering cheap rates. Barizo is also known as an estuarine site.

Prestige Oil Spill
Barizo is one of the towns affected by the Prestige oil spill which happened off the Galician coast. Barizo was the most affected town according to a research study done after the Prestige oil spill. The Barizo beach suffered a high amount of Petroleum Hydrocarbon. The fishing industry also suffered a lot.

Other necessary information
Galician language is widely spoken in the town.

External links 
 Effect of the Prestige Oil Spill on Salt Marsh Soils on the Coast of Galicia (Northwestern Spain) A research study done after the Prestige Oil Spill. It shows the damage incurred not only in Barizo but in other Galician coastal towns.
 Pictures of Prestige Oil Spill Barizo beach damage is shown on Images a-d

Province of A Coruña